The 2019–20 Houston Rockets season was the 53rd season of the franchise in the National Basketball Association (NBA), and their 49th in the Houston area.

After what was an uneventful off-season for the Rockets, failing to land Houston native Jimmy Butler, the Rockets acquired star point guard Russell Westbrook from the Oklahoma City Thunder in exchange for Chris Paul and a trove of future draft considerations, reuniting Westbrook with former Thunder teammate James Harden, who had played his first 3 seasons with the Thunder and was part of the 2011–12 Thunder team that appeared in the 2012 NBA Finals.

With the San Antonio Spurs missing the playoffs for the first time since the 1996-97 season, the Rockets would hold the longest active playoff streak in the NBA qualifying every year since the 2012–13 season.

In February, Westbrook and Harden became the first teammates in NBA history to average 30+ points and 5+ assists per game.

This marked the team's third straight divisional championship, as well as James Harden's 8th straight All-Star selection as a Rocket.

In the playoffs, the Rockets defeated the Oklahoma City Thunder, Westbrook and Harden's former team, in Game 7 of the first round. However, in the Western Conference semifinals, they would lose in 5 games to the eventual champion Los Angeles Lakers.

COVID-19 Impact
The season was suspended by the league officials following the games of March 11 after it was reported that Rudy Gobert tested positive for COVID-19. On June 26 the NBA and National Basketball Players Association finalized a comprehensive plan, and it was announced that the 2019–20 season would resume in the NBA Bubble on July 30, with health and safety precautions and rules enforceable by warning, fine, suspension, or campus ban, including establishing a hotline for players to report violations of COVID-19 restrictions, a single-site campus at Walt Disney World Resort in Orlando, Florida and an intentional goal to take "collective action to combat systemic racism and promote social justice." Fourteen-year NBA veteran player Thabo Sefolosha opted out of continuing on with the team in the wake of the pandemic. Westbrook also tested positive for the virus and the diagnosis was formally announced in July prior to the team heading to Orlando. He flew to Orlando to join the team on July 20 following NBA mandated quarantine requirements and two negative COVID-19 test results. The league's July 20 COVID-19 testing update stated that no players of the 346 at the "NBA bubble" complex had tested positive within the week prior. A July 16 news report stated that the Rockets were the first NBA team publicly known to file a lawsuit to recover COVID-19-related losses by suing Affiliated FM Insurance for denying its business-interruption claim.

Draft picks

The Rockets did not hold any picks for the 2019 NBA draft. This was the third time in franchise history that they did not hold any picks in the draft; the last time was in 1989.

Roster

Standings

Division

Conference

Game log

Preseason

|- style="background:#cfc;"
| 1
| September 30
| Shanghai Sharks
| 
| Clint Capela (25)
| Harden, Blossomgame (12)
| James Harden (17)
| Toyota Center16,155
| 1–0
|- style="background:#cfc;"
| 2
| October 4
| @ LA Clippers
| 
| James Harden (37)
| Clint Capela (11)
| James Harden (7)
| Stan Sheriff Center10,300
| 2-0
|- style="background:#fcc;"
| 3
| October 8
| @ Toronto
| 
| James Harden (34)
| Clint Capela (5)
| James Harden (7)
| Saitama Super Arena20,413
| 2–1
|- style="background:#cfc;"
| 4
| October 10
| Toronto
| 
| Harden, Westbrook (22)
| P. J. Tucker (10)
| James Harden (9)
| Saitama Super Arena20,413
| 3–1
|- style="background:#fcc;"
| 5
| October 16
| San Antonio
| 
| James Harden (40)
| James Harden (10)
| James Harden (7)
| Toyota Center17,283
| 3–2
|- style="background:#cfc;"
| 6
| October 18
| @ Miami
| 
| James Harden (44)
| Clint Capela (13)
| James Harden (7)
| American Airlines Arena19,600
| 4–2

Regular season

|- style="background:#fcc;"
| 1
| October 24
| Milwaukee
| 
| Russell Westbrook (24)
| Russell Westbrook (16)
| James Harden (14)
| Toyota Center18,055
| 0–1
|- style="background:#cfc;"
| 2
| October 26
| New Orleans
| 
| James Harden (29)
| Russell Westbrook (10)
| Russell Westbrook (13)
| Toyota Center18,055
| 1–1
|- style="background:#cfc;"
| 3
| October 28
| Oklahoma City
| 
| James Harden (40)
| Russell Westbrook (12)
| James Harden (7)
| Toyota Center18,055
| 2–1
|- style="background:#cfc;"
| 4
| October 30
| @ Washington
| 
| James Harden (59)
| Russell Westbrook (10)
| Russell Westbrook (12)
| Capital One Arena20,476
| 3–1

|- style="background:#fcc;"
| 5
| November 1
| @ Brooklyn
| 
| James Harden (26)
| Chandler, Tucker (8)
| Harden, Westbrook (8)
| Barclays Center17,732
| 3–2
|- style="background:#fcc;"
| 6
| November 3
| @ Miami
| 
| James Harden (29)
| Clint Capela (7)
| Russell Westbrook (6)
| American Airlines Arena19,724
| 3–3
|- style="background:#cfc;"
| 7
| November 4
| @ Memphis
| 
| James Harden (44)
| Clint Capela (13)
| James Harden (6)
| FedExForum14,197
| 4–3
|- style="background:#cfc;"
| 8
| November 6
| Golden State
| 
| James Harden (36)
| Clint Capela (16)
| James Harden (13)
| Toyota Center18,055
| 5–3
|- style="background:#cfc;"
| 9
| November 9
| @ Chicago
| 
| James Harden (42)
| Clint Capela (20)
| James Harden (9)
| United Center20,482
| 6–3
|- style="background:#cfc;"
| 10
| November 11
| @ New Orleans
| 
| James Harden (39)
| Clint Capela (20)
| James Harden (9)
| Smoothie King Center16,695
| 7–3
|- style="background:#cfc;"
| 11
| November 13
| L. A. Clippers
| 
| James Harden (47)
| Clint Capela (20)
| James Harden (7)
| Toyota Center18,055
| 8–3
|- style="background:#cfc;"
| 12
| November 15
| Indiana
| 
| James Harden (44)
| P. J. Tucker (12)
| Russell Westbrook (6)
| Toyota Center18,055
| 9–3
|- style="background:#cfc;"
| 13
| November 16
| @ Minnesota
| 
| James Harden (49)
| Isaiah Hartenstein (16)
| James Harden (6)
| Target Center18,978
| 10–3
|- style="background:#cfc;"
| 14
| November 18
| Portland
| 
| James Harden (36)
| Clint Capela (20)
| Russell Westbrook (10)
| Toyota Center18,055
| 11–3
|- style="background:#fcc;"
| 15
| November 20
| @ Denver
| 
| James Harden (27)
| Clint Capela (21)
| James Harden (7)
| Pepsi Center17,778
| 11–4
|- style="background:#fcc;"
| 16
| November 22
| @ L. A. Clippers
| 
| James Harden (37)
| Clint Capela (19)
| James Harden (12)
| Staples Center19,068
| 11–5
|- style="background:#fcc;"
| 17
| November 24
| Dallas
| 
| James Harden (32)
| Clint Capela (23)
| James Harden (11)
| Toyota Center18,055
| 11–6
|- style="background:#cfc;"
| 18
| November 27
| Miami
| 
| James Harden (34)
| Russell Westbrook (9)
| Russell Westbrook (7)
| Toyota Center18,055
| 12–6
|- style="background:#cfc;"
| 19
| November 30
| Atlanta
| 
| James Harden (60)
| Ben McLemore (13)
| Harden, Westbrook (8)
| Toyota Center18,055
| 13–6

|- style="background:#fcc;"
| 20
| December 3
| @ San Antonio
| 
| James Harden (50)
| Clint Capela (21)
| Russell Westbrook (10)
| AT&T Center18,354
| 13–7
|- style="background:#cfc;"
| 21
| December 5
| @ Toronto
| 
| Ben McLemore (28)
| Westbrook, Capela (13)
| Russell Westbrook (11)
| Scotiabank Arena19,800
| 14–7
|- style="background:#cfc;"
| 22
| December 7
| Phoenix
| 
| James Harden (34)
| Russell Westbrook (14)
| Russell Westbrook (11)
| Toyota Center18,055
| 15–7
|- style="background:#fcc;"
| 23
| December 9
| Sacramento
| 
| Russell Westbrook (34)
| P. J. Tucker (19)
| James Harden (10)
| Toyota Center18,055
| 15–8
|- style="background:#cfc;"
| 24
| December 11
| @ Cleveland
| 
| James Harden (55)
| Clint Capela (13)
| James Harden (8)
| Rocket Mortgage FieldHouse17,122
| 16–8
|- style="background:#cfc;"
| 25
| December 13
| @ Orlando
| 
| James Harden (54)
| Tucker, Capela (11)
| James Harden (7)
| Amway Center16,335
| 17–8
|- style="background:#fcc;"
| 26
| December 14
| Detroit
| 
| James Harden (39)
| Clint Capela (19)
| James Harden (7)
| Toyota Center18,055
| 17–9
|- style="background:#cfc;"
| 27
| December 16
| San Antonio
| 
| Russell Westbrook (31)
| Clint Capela (15)
| James Harden (7)
| Toyota Center18,055
| 18–9
|- style="background:#cfc;"
| 28
| December 19
| @ L. A. Clippers
| 
| Russell Westbrook (40)
| P. J. Tucker (12)
| James Harden (10)
| Staples Center19,068
| 19–9
|- style="background:#cfc;"
| 29
| December 21
| @ Phoenix
| 
| James Harden (47)
| Clint Capela (17)
| Russell Westbrook (10)
| Talking Stick Resort Arena16,061
| 20–9
|- style="background:#cfc;"
| 30
| December 23
| @ Sacramento
| 
| James Harden (34)
| Clint Capela (14)
| Russell Westbrook (6)
| Golden 1 Center17,583
| 21–9
|- style="background:#fcc;"
| 31
| December 25
| @ Golden State
| 
| Russell Westbrook (30)
| Russell Westbrook (11)
| James Harden (11)
| Chase Center  18,064
| 21–10
|- style="background:#cfc;"
| 32
| December 28
| Brooklyn
| 
| James Harden (44)
| Isaiah Hartenstein (13)
| Russell Westbrook (7)
| Toyota Center18,306
| 22–10
|- style="background:#fcc;"
| 33
| December 29
| @ New Orleans
| 
| Danuel House (22)
| Isaiah Hartenstein (9)
| Chris Clemons (9)
| Smoothie King Center17,712
| 22–11
|- style="background:#cfc;"
| 34
| December 31
| Denver
| 
| James Harden (35)
| Isaiah Hartenstein (12)
| Russell Westbrook (7)
| Toyota Center18,055
| 23–11

|- style="background:#cfc;"
| 35
| January 3
| Philadelphia
| 
| James Harden (44)
| Clint Capela (14)
| James Harden (11)
| Toyota Center18,055
| 24–11
|- style="background:#cfc;"
| 36
| January 8
| @ Atlanta
| 
| James Harden (41)
| Clint Capela (22)
| James Harden (10)
| State Farm Arena16,514
| 25–11
|- style="background:#fcc;"
| 37
| January 9
| @ Oklahoma City
| 
| Russell Westbrook (34)
| Clint Capela (11)
| Russell Westbrook (5)
| Chesapeake Energy Arena18,203
| 25–12
|- style="background:#cfc;"
| 38
| January 11
| Minnesota
| 
| James Harden (32)
| Isaiah Hartenstein (15)
| Russell Westbrook (10)
| Toyota Center18,055
| 26–12
|- style="background:#fcc;"
| 39
| January 14
| @ Memphis
| 
| James Harden (41)
| Clint Capela (16)
| James Harden (6)
| FedExForum16,181
| 26–13
|- style="background:#fcc;"
| 40
| January 15
| Portland
| 
| Russell Westbrook (31)
| Clint Capela (18)
| Russell Westbrook (12)
| Toyota Center18,055
| 26–14
|- style="background:#fcc;"
| 41
| January 18
| L. A. Lakers
| 
| Russell Westbrook (35)
| Clint Capela (12)
| Westbrook, Harden (7)
| Toyota Center18,055
| 26–15
|- style="background:#fcc;"
| 42
| January 20
| Oklahoma City
| 
| Russell Westbrook (32)
| Russell Westbrook (11)
| Russell Westbrook (12)
| Toyota Center18,055
| 26–16
|- style="background:#cfc;"
| 43
| January 22
| Denver
| 
| Russell Westbrook (28)
| Russell Westbrook (16)
| Russell Westbrook (8)
| Toyota Center18,055
| 27–16
|- style="background:#cfc;"
| 44
| January 24
| @ Minnesota
| 
| Russell Westbrook (45)
| Clint Capela (9)
| Russell Westbrook (10)
| Target Center16,101
| 28–16
|- style="background:#fcc;"
| 45
| January 26
| @ Denver
| 
| Russell Westbrook (32)
| Clint Capela (12)
| Russell Westbrook (7)
| Pepsi Center19,520
| 28–17
|- style="background:#cfc;"
| 46
| January 27
| @ Utah
| 
| Eric Gordon (50)
| Danuel House (11)
| P. J. Tucker (5)
| Vivint Smart Home Arena18,306
| 29–17
|- style="background:#fcc;"
| 47
| January 29
| @ Portland
| 
| Russell Westbrook (39)
| Russell Westbrook (10)
| Russell Westbrook (6)
| Moda Center19,393
| 29–18
|- style="background:#cfc;"
| 48
| January 31
| Dallas
| 
| James Harden (35)
| James Harden (16)
| Russell Westbrook (9)
| Toyota Center18,055
| 30–18

|- style="background:#cfc;"
| 49
| February 2
| New Orleans
| 
| James Harden (40)
| Danuel House (12)
| James Harden (9)
| Toyota Center18,055
| 31–18
|- style="background:#cfc;"
| 50
| February 4
| Charlotte
| 
| James Harden (40)
| P. J. Tucker (10)
| James Harden (12)
| Toyota Center18,055
| 32–18
|- style="background:#cfc;"
| 51
| February 6
| @ L. A. Lakers
| 
| Russell Westbrook (41)
| Covington, Westbrook (8)
| James Harden (7)
| Staples Center18,997
| 33–18
|- style="background:#fcc;"
| 52
| February 7
| @ Phoenix
| 
| James Harden (32)
| Danuel House (6)
| James Harden (5)
| Talking Stick Resort Arena17,043
| 33–19
|- style="background:#fcc;"
| 53
| February 9
| Utah
| 
| Russell Westbrook (39)
| James Harden (10)
| James Harden (10)
| Toyota Center18,055
| 33–20
|- style="background:#cfc;"
| 54
| February 11
| Boston
| 
| James Harden (42)
| Russell Westbrook (10)
| James Harden (7)
| Toyota Center18,055
| 34–20
|- style="background:#cfc;"
| 55
| February 20
| @ Golden State
| 
| James Harden (29)
| Covington, Tucker, Westbrook (5)
| Harden, Westbrook (10)
| Chase Center18,064
| 35–20
|- style="background:#cfc;"
| 56
| February 22
| @ Utah
| 
| James Harden (38)
| Robert Covington (12)
| James Harden (7)
| Vivint Smart Home Arena18,306
| 36–20
|- style="background:#cfc;"
| 57
| February 24
| New York
| 
| James Harden (37)
| Robert Covington (7)
| James Harden (9)
| Toyota Center18,055
| 37–20
|- style="background:#cfc;"
| 58
| February 26
| Memphis
| 
| Russell Westbrook (33)
| Russell Westbrook (9)
| Russell Westbrook (8)
| Toyota Center18,055
| 38–20
|- style="background:#cfc;"
| 59
| February 29
| @ Boston
| 
| Russell Westbrook (41)
| Robert Covington (16)
| James Harden (8)
| TD Garden19,156
| 39–20

|- style="background:#fcc;"
| 60
| March 2
| @ New York
| 
| James Harden (35)
| Robert Covington (13)
| James Harden (8)
| Madison Square Garden18,142
| 39–21
|- style="background:#fcc;"
| 61
| March 5
| L. A. Clippers
| 
| Russell Westbrook (29)
| Russell Westbrook (15)
| Russell Westbrook (5)
| Toyota Center18,055
| 39–22
|- style="background:#fcc;"
| 62
| March 7
| @ Charlotte
| 
| James Harden (30)
| James Harden (10)
| James Harden (14)
| Spectrum Center19,159
| 39–23
|- style="background:#fcc;"
| 63
| March 8
| Orlando
| 
| Russell Westbrook (24)
| Russell Westbrook (8)
| James Harden (6)
| Toyota Center18,055
| 39–24
|- style="background:#cfc;"
| 64
| March 10
| Minnesota
| 
| James Harden (37)
| P. J. Tucker (11)
| Harden, Westbrook (7)
| Toyota Center18,055
| 40–24

|- style="background:#cfc;"
| 65
| July 31
| @ Dallas
| 
| James Harden (49)
| Covington, Westbrook (11)
| Harden, Westbrook (8)
| The ArenaNo In-Person Attendance
| 41–24
|- style="background:#cfc;"
| 66
| August 2
| Milwaukee
| 
| Russell Westbrook (31)
| Covington, Harden (7)
| Russell Westbrook (8)
| The ArenaNo In-Person Attendance
| 42–24
|- style="background:#fcc;"
| 67
| August 4
| @ Portland
| 
| James Harden (23)
| Covington, Tucker (8)
| Harden, Westbrook (9)
| The ArenaNo In-Person Attendance
| 42–25
|- style="background:#cfc;"
| 68
| August 6
| L. A. Lakers
| 
| James Harden (39)
| James Harden (8)
| James Harden (12)
| The ArenaNo In-Person Attendance
| 43–25
|- style="background:#cfc;"
| 69
| August 9
| @ Sacramento
| 
| Austin Rivers (41)
| Robert Covington (13)
| James Harden (7)
| HP Field HouseNo In-Person Attendance
| 44–25
|- style="background:#fcc;"
| 70
| August 11
| @ San Antonio
| 
| Russell Westbrook (20)
| Robert Covington (9)
| Russell Westbrook (6)
| HP Field HouseNo In-Person Attendance
| 44–26
|- style="background:#fcc;"
| 71
| August 12
| Indiana
| 
| James Harden (45)
| James Harden (17)
| James Harden (9)
| The ArenaNo In-Person Attendance
| 44–27
|- style="background:#fcc;"
| 72
| August 14
| Philadelphia
| 
| James Harden (27)
| Bruno Caboclo (6)
| James Harden (10)
| The ArenaNo In-Person Attendance
| 44–28

|- style="background:#;"
| 65
| March 12
| @ LA Lakers
| 
|
|
|
| Staples Center
|
|- style="background:#;"
| 66
| March 15
| @ Portland
| 
|
|
|
| Moda Center
|
|- style="background:#;"
| 67
| March 17
| Cleveland
| 
|
|
|
| Toyota Center
|
|- style="background:#;"
| 68
| March 19
| Sacramento
| 
|
|
|
| Toyota Center
|
|- style="background:#;"
| 69
| March 21
| Chicago
| 
|
|
|
| Toyota Center
|
|- style="background:#;"
| 70
| March 23
| @ Dallas
| 
|
|
|
| American Airlines Center
|
|- style="background:#;"
| 71
| March 25
| @ Milwaukee
| 
|
|
|
| Fiserv Forum
|
|- style="background:#;"
| 72
| March 27
| @ Indiana
| 
|
|
|
| Bankers Life Fieldhouse
|
|- style="background:#;"
| 73
| March 29
| @ Detroit
| 
|
|
|
| Little Caesars Arena
|
|- style="background:#;"
| 74
| March 31
| Philadelphia
| 
|
|
|
| Wells Fargo Center
|
|- style="background:#;"
| 75
| April 2
| Golden State
| 
|
|
|
| Toyota Center
|
|- style="background:#;"
| 76
| April 5
| Toronto
| 
|
|
|
| Toyota Center
|
|- style="background:#;"
| 77
| April 7
| @ Dallas
| 
|
|
|
| American Airlines Center
|
|- style="background:#;"
| 78
| April 8
| San Antonio
| 
|
|
|
| Toyota Center
|
|- style="background:#;"
| 79
| April 10
| Washington
| 
|
|
|
| Toyota Center
|
|- style="background:#;"
| 80
| April 12
| @ San Antonio
| 
|
|
|
| AT&T Center
|
|- style="background:#;"
| 81
| April 13
| Phoenix
| 
|
|
|
| Toyota Center
|
|- style="background:#;"
| 82
| April 15
| Memphis
| 
|
|
|
| Toyota Center
|

Playoffs

|- style="background:#cfc;"
| 1
| August 18
| Oklahoma City
| 
| James Harden (37)
| James Harden (11)
| Danuel House (5)
| HP Field HouseNo In-Person Attendance
| 1–0
|- style="background:#cfc;"
| 2
| August 20
| Oklahoma City
| 
| James Harden (21)
| Danuel House (9)
| James Harden (9)
| The ArenaNo In-Person Attendance
| 2–0
|- style="background:#fcc;"
| 3
| August 22
| @ Oklahoma City
| 
| James Harden (38)
| Danuel House (10)
| James Harden (8)
| HP Field HouseNo In-Person Attendance
| 2–1
|- style="background:#fcc;"
| 4
| August 24
| @ Oklahoma City
| 
| James Harden (32)
| P. J. Tucker (11)
| James Harden (15)
| The ArenaNo In-Person Attendance
| 2–2
|- style="background:#cfc;"
| 5
| August 29
| Oklahoma City
| 
| James Harden (31)
| Jeff Green (10)
| Russell Westbrook (7)
| HP Field HouseNo In-Person Attendance
| 3–2
|- style="background:#fcc;"
| 6
| August 31
| @ Oklahoma City
| 
| James Harden (32)
| P. J. Tucker (11)
| James Harden (7)
| The ArenaNo In-Person Attendance
| 3–3
|- style="background:#cfc;"
| 7
| September 2
| Oklahoma City
| 
| Covington, Gordon (21)
| Robert Covington (10)
| James Harden (9)
| The ArenaNo In-Person Attendance
| 4–3

|- style="background:#cfc;"
| 1
| September 4
| @ L. A. Lakers
| 
| James Harden (36)
| Tucker, Westbrook (9)
| Russell Westbrook (6)
| The ArenaNo In-Person Attendance
| 1–0
|- style="background:#fcc;"
| 2
| September 6
| @ L. A. Lakers
| 
| James Harden (27)
| Russell Westbrook (13)
| James Harden (7)
| The ArenaNo In-Person Attendance
| 1–1
|- style="background:#fcc;"
| 3
| September 8
| L. A. Lakers
| 
| James Harden (33)
| James Harden (9)
| James Harden (9)
| The ArenaNo In-Person Attendance
| 1–2
|- style="background:#fcc;"
| 4
| September 10
| L. A. Lakers
| 
| Russell Westbrook (25)
| Jeff Green (7)
| James Harden (10)
| The ArenaNo In-Person Attendance
| 1–3
|- style="background:#fcc;"
| 5
| September 12
| @ L. A. Lakers
| 
| James Harden (30)
| James Harden (6)
| Russell Westbrook (6)
| The ArenaNo In-Person Attendance
| 1–4

Transactions

Trades

Free agency

Re-signed

Additions

Subtractions

References

Houston Rockets seasons
Houston Rockets
Houston Rockets
Houston Rockets